NGC 539 is a barred spiral galaxy in the constellation of Cetus south. It is estimated to be 429 million light years from the Milky Way and has a diameter of approximately 200,000 ly.

See also 
 List of NGC objects (1–1000)

References 

Barred spiral galaxies
Cetus (constellation)
0539
005269